Australian(s) may refer to:

Australia
 Australia, a country
 Australians, citizens of the Commonwealth of Australia
 European Australians
 Anglo-Celtic Australians, Australians descended principally from British colonists
 Aboriginal Australians, indigenous peoples of Australia as identified and defined within Australian law
 Australia (continent)
 Indigenous Australians
 Australian English, the dialect of the English language spoken in Australia
 Australian Aboriginal languages
 The Australian, a newspaper
 Australiana, things of Australian origins

Other uses
 Australian (horse), a racehorse
 Australian, British Columbia, an unincorporated community in Canada

See also

 The Australian (disambiguation)
 Australia (disambiguation)
 
 
 Austrian (disambiguation)

Language and nationality disambiguation pages